Marvin Lewis Woodson (born September 19, 1941) is a former American football defensive back who played six seasons in the NFL for the Pittsburgh Steelers and New Orleans Saints.  He played college football at Indiana.
He wore # 47 for both the Steelers and Saints. He was also drafted by the Denver Broncos in the 3rd round (17th Overall) in the 1964 AFL Draft. He played 72 career games for the Steelers and Saints.

1941 births
Living people
Sportspeople from Hattiesburg, Mississippi
Players of American football from Mississippi
American football safeties
Indiana Hoosiers football players
Pittsburgh Steelers players
New Orleans Saints players
Eastern Conference Pro Bowl players